Mark L. Booth (November 30, 1911 – January 28, 1988) was an American football coach. He served as the head football coach at Waynesburg College—now known as Waynesburg University—in Waynesburg, Pennsylvania for one season in 1942, compiling a record of 2–6. Booth played college football as a guard at Waynesburg.

Booth served in the United States Navy during World War II and the Korean War. He died on January 28, 1988, at Shadyside Hospital in Pittsburgh, Pennsylvania.

Head coaching record

References

External links
 

1911 births
1988 deaths
American football guards
Waynesburg Yellow Jackets football coaches
Waynesburg Yellow Jackets football players
United States Navy personnel of the Korean War
United States Navy personnel of World War II
People from Monroe County, Ohio
Coaches of American football from Pennsylvania
Players of American football from Pittsburgh
Military personnel from Pittsburgh